A chute is a vertical or inclined plane, channel, or passage through which objects are moved by means of gravity.

Landform
A chute, also known as a race, flume, cat, or river canyon, is a steep-sided passage through which water flows rapidly.

Akin to these, man-made chutes, such as the timber slide and log flume, were used in the logging industry to facilitate the downstream transportation of timber along rivers. These are no longer in common use. Man-made chutes may also be a feature of spillways on some dams.  Some types of water supply and irrigation systems are gravity fed, hence chutes.  These include aqueducts, puquios, and acequias.

Building chute
Chutes are in common use in tall buildings to allow the rapid transport of items from the upper floors to a central location on one of the lower floors or basement. Chutes may be round, square or rectangular at the top and/or the bottom.

 Laundry chutes in hotels are placed on each floor to allow the expedient transfer and collection of dirty laundry to the hotel's laundry facility without having to use elevators or stairs. These chutes are generally aluminized steel and welded together to avoid any extruding parts that may rip or damage the materials.

 Home laundry chutes are placed on each floor of multistory homes allow the collection of all household members' dirty laundry to one location, conveniently next to the laundry facilities, without the constant transport of laundry bins from story-to-story or room-to-room or up and down stairs. Home laundry chutes may be less common than previously due to building codes or concern regarding fireblocking, the prevention of fire from spreading from floor-to-floor, as well as child safety. However, construction including cabinets, doors, lids, and locks may make both risks significantly less than with simple stairwells.

 Refuse chute or Garbage chutes are common in high-rise apartment buildings and are used to collect all the building's garbage in one place. Often the bottom end of the chute is placed directly above a large, open waste container. This makes garbage collection faster and more efficient.
 Mail chutes are used in some buildings to collect the occupants' mail.  A notable example is the Asia Insurance Building.
 Escape chutes are used and proposed for use in evacuation of mining equipment and high-rise buildings.
 Construction chutes are used to remove rubble and similar demolition materials safely from taller buildings.  These temporary structures typically consist of a chain of cylindrical or conical plastic tubes, each fitted into the top of the one below and tied together, usually with chains.  Together they form a long flexible tube, which is hung down the side of the building.  The lower end of this tube is placed over a skip or other receptacle, and waste materials are dropped into the top.  Heavy duty steel chutes may also be used when the debris being deposited is heavy duty and in cases of particularly high buildings.

An elevator is not a chute as it does not move by gravity.

Chutes in transportation 
Goust, a hamlet in southwestern France, is notable for its mountainside chute that is used to transport coffins.

Chutes are also found in:
 Hopper cars
 Hopper barges

References

Building engineering
Landforms